Bribir is a village in Šibenik-Knin County, near the town of Skradin, southern Croatia.

Geography
The village is located at the foot of the hill of Bribir, in the Ravni Kotari geographical region. It is 12 km from Skradin.

History

In the Roman period, the town (municipium) of Varvaria was created in the 1st century AD at the hill of Bribir, which is now an archaeological site. Up until the Roman conquest, the Liburnians had inhabited the region, giving their name to the Roman province of Liburnia. Pliny the Elder mentioned Varvarini as one of 14 municipalities under the jurisdiction of Scardona (Skradin). In the Migration Period, after the fall of the Roman Empire, the region switched hands, being occupied by the Ostrogoths, Byzantines and then Croats.

In De Administrando Imperio (950s), Berber is one of the counties part of Littoral Croatia. Bribir achieved its peak in the 13th and 14th century, during the period when the members of Šubić family ruled over Croatia as the Bans of Croatia. Šubićs were called nobiles, comites or principes Breberienses (Princes of Breber). They built a large palace on the hill of Bribir, an ideal place to control the surrounding territory, overseeing all roads and approaches from the sea to the hinterland.

The town was settled by Orthodox population in the 16th century. It was part of the war-time Republic of Serbian Krajina (1991–1995).

Buildings and monuments
Remains of Roman and medieval buildings
Remains of Roman-era city-walls, with medieval defensive tower
Late antique rotunda (below SS Joachim and Ann) and Early Christian mausoleum with sarcophagi
Roman-era nymphaeum with mosaics
Early medieval cemetery Vratnice from ca. 9th century
Remains of Romanesque-style church from ca. 13th century
Remains of St Mary church and Franciscan monastery from ca. 1300
Remains of Gothic-style church from ca. 14th century
Serbian Orthodox Church (Temple) of St. Joachim and Anne, built in 1574
Remains of Ottoman-Venetian defensive tower

Demographic history
In the 2011 census, the village had 103 inhabitants.

References

Further reading 
 Zlatni vijek Bribira 
 A. Milošević, Bribir: Past and the Monuments
 Bibliography of works on Bribir on Varvaria-Breberium-Bribir website

External links 
 Bribir at tz-vinodol.hr

Populated places in Šibenik-Knin County
Archaeological sites in Croatia
Tourist attractions in Šibenik-Knin County

Illyrian Croatia
Cities in ancient Illyria
Medieval sites in Croatia